The Hale Formation is a geologic formation in northern Arkansas that dates to the Morrowan Series of the early Pennsylvanian. The Hale Formation has two named members: the Cane Hill and the Prairie Grove Members. The lower member is the Cane Hill, a primarily sandstone and shale interval that unconformably overlies the Mississippian-age Pitkin Formation. The upper member, the Prairie Grove Member, is predominately limestone and conformably underlies the Bloyd Formation.

Nomenclature
Named by J. A. Taff in 1905, the Hale Formation was originally called the "Hale sandstone lentil" of the Morrow Formation after Hale Mountain in Washington County, Arkansas. In the same year, George I. Adams and E. O. Ulrich called it the "Hale sandstone member" of the Morrow Formation. In 1907, Albert Homer Purdue raised the rank to the Hale Formation of the Morrow Group, however, the Morrow Group was later abandoned as a stratigraphic unit in 1961. A stratotype was not designated by J. A. Taff and, as of 2017, no reference section has been designated.

The Cane Hill Member was named after the town of Cane Hill in Washington County, Arkansas in 1953 by Lloyd G. Henbest, who also named its upper member, the Prairie Grove Member, after the town of Prairie Grove, in Washington County, Arkansas. Henbest did not designate a stratotype for either of these members, and as of 2017, neither of them have been designated a reference section.

In the eastern parts of the Ozarks in Arkansas, the Hale Formation becomes undifferentiated with the overlying Bloyd Formation and is called the Witts Springs Formation.

Paleontology

Blastoids
Pentremites
P. angustus
P. rusticus

Brachiopods

Anthracospirifer 
Antiquatonia
Beecheria
Cleiothyridina 
Composita 
Desmoinesia 
Echinaria
Hustedia
Krotovia
Leptagonia 
Linoproductus 
Neochonetes

Phricodothyris
Punctospirifer 
Schizophoria 
Plicochonetes
Rhipidomella
Rhynchopora
Sandia
Schizophoria 
Spiriferellina
Tesuquea 
T. morrowensis
Zia

Bryozoans
Fenestella morrowensis
F. venusta 
Fistulipora matheri 
Matheropora triseriata 
Polypora anastomosa 
P. constricta 
P. halensis 
P. magna 
P. purduei 
P. reversispina 
P. triseriata 
P. washingtonensis 
Phyllopora perforata 
Septopora crebripora 
Sulcoretepora brentwoodensis 
S. sinuomarginata

Cephalopods

Arkanites relictus
Bactrites redactus 
B. gaitherensis
Baschkirites
B. librovitchi
Bisatoceras secundum 
Branneroceras branneri 
Cancelloceras huntsvillense 
Cymoceras cracens
Dinocycloceras prolixum
Endolobus 
Ephippioceras ferratum 
Glaphyrites morrowensis 
Gordonites matheri
G. filifer 
Homoceratoides cracens
Hudsonoceras moorei 
Knightoceras oxylobatum
K. palatum 

Paradimorphoceras
Proshumardites morrowanus
Pseudopronorites quinni 
P. arkansiensis
Pseudorthoceras knoxense 
Quinnites henbetsi
Q. textum 
Ramosites
Reticuloceras wainwrighti 
R. tiro 
R. semiretia 
Retites semiretia
Schartymites paynei
Syngastrioceras globosum
S. oblatum 
Verneuilites pygmaeus 
Wiedeyoceras matheri

Conodonts

Gondolella
G. clarki
Idiognathodus
I. klapperi
I. sinuosus
Idiognathoides
I. convexus
I. sinuatus

Neognathodus
N. bassleri
N. symmetricus
Rhachistognathus
R. primus

Crinoids
Arkacrinus
Eirmocrinus
Palmerocrinus

Flora
Archaeolithophyllum
A. missouiense
Asphaltina
A. cordillerensis
Eflugelia
Girvanella
Stacheoides
S. spissa

Foraminifera

Asteroarchaediscus
A. rugosus
Biseriella
Climacammina
C. antiqua
Diplosphaerina
D. inaequalis
Earlandia
Endothyra
Eosigmoinina
E. rugosa
Eostaffella
E. pinguis
Hemiarchaediscus
Millerella
M. marblensis
M. pressa

Neoarchaediscus
Paleonubecularia
Paramillerella
P. pinuis
Planoendothyra
Plectogyra
P. tantala
Pseudoglomospira
Tetrataxis
T. maxima
Tubertina
T. plana
Turrispoiroides
T. multivolutus

Ostracods
Glyptopleua
 G. whitei
Healdia
Kirkbyella (Berdanella)
Knightina
Shivaella

Trace Fossils

Gastrochaenolites anauchen

Trypanites

Incertae sedis
Clacisphaera
C. laevis
Proninella
P. strigosa

See also

 List of fossiliferous stratigraphic units in Arkansas
 Paleontology in Arkansas

References

Carboniferous Kansas
Carboniferous Arkansas
Carboniferous southern paleotropical deposits